Zbigniew Kowalski  (born December 10, 1970) is a retired Polish professional footballer, who played as a defender.

External links
 Player profile Znicz Pruszków 

1970 births
Living people
Polish footballers
Jagiellonia Białystok players
Górnik Łęczna players
KSZO Ostrowiec Świętokrzyski players
Znicz Pruszków players
People from Świecie
Sportspeople from Kuyavian-Pomeranian Voivodeship

Association football defenders